California (minor planet designation: 341 California) is an asteroid belonging to the Flora family in the Main Belt. It was discovered by Max Wolf on 25 September 1892 in Heidelberg, and is named for the U.S. state of California. The orbital plane is inclined at an angle of 5.7° to the plane of the ecliptic.

The very slow rotation rate of this asteroid favors collecting photometric data for an extended period in order to measure the period. It has an unusually high albedo.

References

External links 
 
 

000341
Discoveries by Max Wolf
Named minor planets
000341
000341
18920925